is a Japanese former professional footballer who played as a midfielder. Hiroyama played over 400 games during his career which included spells in Japan, France, Portugal, Paraguay, Brazil and United States, as well as earning two caps with the Japanese national team. Hiroyama was the first Japanese footballer to dispute the Copa Libertadores competition.

Club career

Japan
Hiroyama began his career with his hometown team, JEF United Ichihara, in the Japanese J1 League, helping his team to the final of the J.League Cup in 1998, and making 120 appearances and scoring 20 goals in total in his four years with the team. Whilst Hiroyama was at JEF United, the physical trainer of the team was Paraguayan, who gave good references to him, and then the opportunity was given to Hiroyama to play at Cerro Porteño.

South America

Cerro Porteño
Hiroyama signed for Paraguayan side Cerro Porteño in 2001, and during his time in South America became the first Japanese footballer to play and score in the Copa Libertadores. Hiroyama featured for Cerro Porteño for 1 year and a half. He was coached by Cesar Jacquet.

Hiroyama was one of two foreigners in Cerro Porteño's squad, which included Costa Rican footballer Froylan Ledezma. In Cerro Porteño's team, Hiroyama colleagued with Aldo Bobadilla, Diego Barreto, Nelson Zelaya, Carlos Baez, Sergio Aquino, Jorge Luis Campos, Guido Alvarenga, Julio dos Santos, Cesar Ramirez, Virgilio Ferreira, Santiago Salcedo and Ledezma.

Hiroyama scored 3 goals in 27 league games for Cerro Porteño. Hiroyama scored in a 1-0 victory against Sportivo San Lorenzo.

In the 2001 Copa Libertadores, Hiroyama scored 2 goals in 7 games. On 22 March 2001, Hiroyama scored a double in a 4-0 away victory against Sport Boys Callao in the Copa Libertadores. Both goals came in the first half of the game. On 10 April, Hiroyama played in Cerro Porteño's 6-0 home victory against Universidad de Chile. On 10 May in Cerro Porteño's first-leg tie of the Copa Libertadores round of 16 stage against Mexican club Cruz Azul, Hiroyama played in the team's 2-1 home victory. On 16 May, Hiroyama played in the team's 3-1 away defeat in the second-leg.

Hiroyama also played in the 2001 Copa Mercosur, appearing 8 times. He started on 5 occasions in the competition.

Hiroyama was champion with Cerro Porteño in the tournament of 2001.

Sport Recife
He moved to Brazilian side Sport Recife prior to the 2002 season, but never managed to find a way into the team, and left for Europe halfway through the season without making a senior appearance.

Europe
Hiroyama signed for Portuguese team Braga in the winter of 2002, but made just 8 appearances for the team before moving on to French side Montpellier; again, Hiroyama was unable to cement a place in the first team, and returned home to Japan prior to the beginning of the 2004 J1 League season.

Japan
Hiroyama quickly established himself at Tokyo Verdy, helping his team win the 2004 Emperor's Cup, and playing in the 2006 AFC Champions League, but was unable to prevent his side being relegated into J2 that same year. He had a brief spell on loan at Cerezo Osaka in 2005, before moving on to J2 side Thespa Kusatsu in 2009,m having made 79 league appearances and scored 11 goals for Tokyo.

United States
Hiroyama signed with Richmond Kickers of the USL Professional Division on March 16, 2011, and made his debut for his new team on April 9, in a game against the Pittsburgh Riverhounds

On August 17, 2012, Hiroyama announced his retirement from professional football.

International career
In June 1997, Hiroyama was selected Japan U-20 national team for 1997 World Youth Championship. He played 4 matches as right midfielder and scored a goal against Paraguay.

On October 4, 2001, Hiroyama debuted for Japan national team against Senegal. On October 7, he also played against Nigeria. He played 2 games for Japan in 2001.

Coaching career
In 2020, Hiroyama was the second coach of Japan's under-16 national team.

Personal life
In Paraguay, Hiroyama liked Sopa paraguaya and Empanadas. Also, he drank lots of Terere and took with him a Terere thermus kit to keep drinking. In terms of Paraguay's Guarani language, Hiroyama learnt a few words.

Career statistics

Club

International

References

External links

Japan National Football Team Database

 
 
 
 

1977 births
Living people
People from Sodegaura
Sportspeople from Chiba Prefecture
Association football people from Chiba Prefecture
Japanese footballers
Association football midfielders
Japan youth international footballers
Japan international footballers
Footballers at the 1998 Asian Games
Asian Games competitors for Japan
J1 League players
J2 League players
Primeira Liga players
Ligue 1 players
USL Championship players
JEF United Chiba players
Tokyo Verdy players
Cerezo Osaka players
Thespakusatsu Gunma players
Cerro Porteño players
Sport Club do Recife players
Montpellier HSC players
S.C. Braga players
Richmond Kickers players
Japanese expatriate footballers
Japanese expatriate sportspeople in Paraguay
Expatriate footballers in Paraguay
Japanese expatriate sportspeople in Brazil
Expatriate footballers in Brazil
Japanese expatriate sportspeople in Portugal
Expatriate footballers in Portugal
Japanese expatriate sportspeople in France
Expatriate footballers in France
Japanese expatriate sportspeople in the United States
Expatriate soccer players in the United States